Deh Shib (also Romanized as Deh Shīb) is a village in Mud Rural District, Mud District, Sarbisheh County, South Khorasan Province, Iran. At the 2006 census, its population was 71, in 29 families.

References 

Populated places in Sarbisheh County